The 1975 Omloop Het Volk was the 30th edition of the Omloop Het Volk cycle race and was held on 1 March 1975. The race started and finished in Ghent. The race was won by Joseph Bruyère.

General classification

References

1975
Omloop Het Nieuwsblad
Omloop Het Nieuwsblad